Torbenia persimilis, the Libert's glasswing, is a butterfly in the family Lycaenidae. It is found in Nigeria (the Cross River loop), Cameroon and Gabon. The habitat consists of forests.

References

Butterflies described in 2000
Poritiinae